Lussac is a commune in the Gironde department in Nouvelle-Aquitaine in southwestern France.

Population

See also
 Château de Lussac (Lussac Saint-Emilion)
 Communes of the Gironde department

References

Communes of Gironde